Fleming v Ontario, 2019 SCC 45 is a decision of the Supreme Court of Canada on the powers of police officers under the common law ancillary powers doctrine. The Court unanimously held that police officers did not have the authority to arrest someone engaging in lawful conduct to prevent a breach of peace by others.

Background

The Ancillary Powers Doctrine 
The Ancillary Powers Doctrine is a common law rule that assumes that when an obligation is imposed on the executive, they also implicitly gain the 'ancillary' powers necessary to execute it. In the context of police powers, this doctrine is applied through the 'Waterfield Test', a test which originated in the UK but versions of which have since been adopted by the courts of many other common law jurisdictions, including Canada.

Under the test, a police officer could take an action to interfere with a person's liberty or privacy if:

 they were acting in the execution of their duties under common law or statute, and 
 the conduct constituted a justifiable interference with the individual's liberty or privacy

Factual background 
A group of First Nations protesters who had long disputed the Canada's claim to a area of land in Caledonia, Ontario, known as Douglas Creek Estates (D.C.E), occupied the land in a 2006 protest, and also hung indigenous flags across an adjacent street. The land was purchased by the government in the June of that year, who subsequently permitted the occupation. Which in turn caused many residents, who were angry with the protests and the government response to them, to organize their own counter-protests.

In the past, many of these protests had become contentious, and had led to violent clashes between the two groups. When the Ontario Provincial Police (OPP) became aware of another "flag rally" counter-protest, in which protesters hoped to carry the Canadian flag near a site on the street adjacent to the D.C.E, they developed an operational plan to manage it. They barred the counter-protesters from entering the D.C.E and planned to keep both groups of protesters separate from each other.

On the day of the flag rally, Randy Fleming - flying the Canadian flag - was walking north along said street, hoping to join the rally. When he saw a police car coming along the street, he jumped on the property to avoid it. His stepping on the D.C.E. caused a reaction among a group of 10-12 occupying protesters stationed about 100 metres away, who began walking towards him. An OPP officer immediately placed Fleming under arrest, he resisted but was escorted to the police cruiser, and then transported to a jail cell. About 2 and half hours later he was released and charged with obstructing a peace officer. The Crown eventually withdrew the charge around 19 months after it was laid. Fleming sued the province of Ontario and 7 police officers for assault and battery, wrongful arrest, and false imprisonment.

In lower courts 
The trial judge found that the province had infringed Fleming's rights, and found it guilty of battery, wrongful arrest, and false imprisonment. The judge ordered the province to pay over $139,000 in general damages to Fleming, over $150,000 in legal cost, and an additional $5,000 in punitive damages over their breach of his Charter rights. In her ruling, the trial judge stated that the OPP should not have arrested Fleming, who had done nothing unlawful, over a fear that there would a breach of peace. In her ruling she accepted that such arrests might sometimes be lawful, but that in this case the risk of a breach of peace was not substantial, not imminent, and that the police had other reasonable alternatives like setting up a buffer zone.

On appeal, the Ontario Court of Appeal overturned her decision, holding that the police had the power to perform arrests to prevent an anticipated breach of peace under the ancillary powers doctrine. According to the Court of Appeal, the judge had erred in holding there was no imminent risk of a breach of peace because she considered the conflict from an narrow perspective, rather than seeing it in the broader context of the past clashes in Caledonia. The Court cleared the province of all wrong-doing, with the exception of battery, for which it ordered a new trial to determine if excessive force had been used.

Judgement 
Justice Suzanne Côté, writing for a unanimous court, overturned the Court of Appeals' decision, and held that the province was guilty of wrongful arrest, false imprisonment, and battery.

The Court, in applying the Ancillary Powers Doctrine test for police powers, considered:

 Whether the police conduct at issue fell within the general scope of a statutory or common law police duty, and
 whether the conduct involved a justifiable exercise of police powers associated with that duty.

The Court held that while preventing a breach of peace, even through arrest of someone not engaging in unlawful activities, undoubtedly fell within the general scope of police duty, the conduct could not pass muster in the second step.

The Court noted that in the second step courts must assess whether the police conduct was reasonably necessary to fulfil the police duty in question. And in analyzing whether it was, it should assess three factors, previously identified in R v MacDonald. Namely, the importance of the performance of the duty to the public good, the necessity of the interference with individual liberty for the performance of the duty, and the extent of the interference with individual liberty.

The power to arrest law-abiding individuals to prevent a breach of peace, Côté J wrote, failed because the second branch of the test must be applied with rigour to protect the rights and liberty of individuals against unnecessary encroachment by the state. She wrote that the standard of justification must be commensurate with the fundamental rights at stake, and that the bar was particularly high for a power like the one before the Court, for a number of reasons. First, because it intruded on the liberty of someone who had not nor was suspected of engaging in any unlawful activity. Secondly, because the proposed power was inherently preventive in nature, and those types of powers must be recognized by courts with great caution due to their potential to sanction profound infringements on liberty for little societal benefit. And finally, since the purported power would not typically result in criminal charges, judicial oversight would be limited.

Côté J noted that there were few state actions that interfered with liberty as significantly as arrest, and that allowing police officers to arrest someone acting lawfully over the apprehended actions of another would severely undermine the public's expectation of being able to live their lives free of coercive state conduct. She also stated that the mere high effectiveness of arrest could not compensate for its blunt nature, and that there were less intrusive alternatives available to the police to exercise their duty, citing that in this case a buffer zone could have been set up to avoid confrontations like the one that occurred.

See also 

 2019 reasons of the Supreme Court of Canada
 R v Waterfield
 Kosoian v Société de transport de Montréal

References 

 Fleming v Ontario, 2019 SCC 45 [Fleming SCC]

External links 

 

Supreme Court of Canada cases
2019 in Canadian case law